Edward Perrin Edmunds (June 6, 1925 – December 17, 1967) was an American politician and potato grower from Maine. Edmunds, a Republican from Fort Fairfield, served from 1957 to 1964 in the Maine Legislature. He spent two terms (1957-1960) in the Maine House of Representatives and two (1961-1964) in the Maine Senate. During his final term in the Senate, he was chosen Majority Leader.

During his time in the Senate, Edmunds was instrumental in the founding of Northern Maine Community College. Edmunds was a large potato farmer and grower. He also served as President of the National Bank of Fort Fairfield.

References

1925 births
1967 deaths
People from Fort Fairfield, Maine
Republican Party members of the Maine House of Representatives
Majority leaders of the Maine Senate
Hotchkiss School alumni
Yale University alumni
Dartmouth College alumni
Northwestern University alumni
Farmers from Maine
20th-century American politicians